Cradle Orchestra is a Japanese Jazz/Hip Hop band which mixes live orchestral instrumentation with the flows of underground rappers. They have produced five albums.

Discography
2006: Attitude
2009: Velvet Ballads
2009: Aurora Collection
2010: Soulbirds Feat.Nieve & Jean
2010: Transcended Elements
2014: Wherever To with GIOVANCA
2018: Best of Golden Works - Music is the answer

External links 
Cradle Orchestra
Palette Sounds

Japanese hip hop